Glenea voluptuosa is a species of beetle in the family Cerambycidae. It was described by James Thomson in 1860.

Subspecies
 Glenea voluptuosa thetis J. Thomson, 1879
 Glenea voluptuosa voluptuosa Thomson, 1860

References

voluptuosa
Beetles described in 1860